Ordaklu (also Romanized as Ordaklū; also known as Urdaklu) is a village in Samen Rural District, Samen District, Malayer County, Hamadan Province, Iran. At the 2006 census, its population was 50, in 22 families.

References 

Populated places in Malayer County